Biblical Graduate School of Theology (BGST) is an evangelical theological seminary in Singapore. The current principal is Lai Pak Wah.

History and doctrine

Biblical Graduate School of Theology was established in 1989. The founding principal was Quek Swee Hwa, who was succeeded in 2011 by Dr Philip Satterthwaite.

BGST has its roots in Singapore Bible-Presbyterianism; Quek Swee Hwa was the senior pastor of Zion Serangoon Bible-Presbyterian Church when BGST was founded, and the institution was located at Zion Bishan Bible-Presbyterian Church from 1994 to 2004.

Biblical Graduate School of Theology affirms biblical inerrancy, and Jesus' "propitiatory and expiatory death as a representative and substitutionary sacrifice." It focuses on equipping "Christians in all walks of life" to "live more effectively for God."

BGST also affirms belief "in the principle of biblical separation which calls the individual and the church to holiness, being separated to God and from the world." Its statement of faith goes on to say that "ecclesiastical separation involves rejecting any fellowship with organizations which deny the cardinal truths of Scripture in word or deed". This is what is known as "first-degree separation" (the "refusal to associate with groups who endorse questionable doctrinal beliefs or moral practices"), but does not go as far as "second-degree separation" ("refraining from association or identification with groups or individuals who do not practice first-degree separation"). BGST has not adopted the separatist stance of the Far Eastern Bible College, the other seminary in Singapore associated with the Bible-Presbyterian movement.

Accreditation
Biblical Graduate School of Theology is accredited by the Asia Theological Association to offer Graduate Diploma in Christian Studies, Master in Christian Studies, and Master of Divinity degrees.

According to Brian Stiller, BGST has followed Regent College's vision of "giving the same theological integration to people undertaking societal careers as is normally given to people preparing for a Christian service career." BGST and Regent College have an established agreement on the transfer of BGST credits to Regent.

, 80% of BGST graduates were Singaporean. 56% of graduates were lay people who returned to their lay professions; 22% went into pastoral ministry; and 22% went into theological education and missions.

References

External links
 

Educational institutions established in 1989
Seminaries and theological colleges in Singapore
Evangelical seminaries and theological colleges
1989 establishments in Singapore